Brian Kamstra (born 5 July 1993) is a retired Dutch professional cyclist, who raced  for UCI ProTeam . He currently lives in Verona, Italy.

Career

Athletics
Kamstra was a 2-times National Champion in cross country running, in 2010 and 2011. He competed at the 2011 European Cross Country Championships in Velenje, Slovenia. He was considered one of the best juniors in the country. Achieving 4 National titles and over 10 National championship medals.

Cycling
In August 2015, he began racing as a stagiaire with the  professional team. Kamstra started racing bikes in 2015 after being diagnosed with Type 1 Diabetes in 2013.

2016 marked Kamstra's first full season as a professional. His first professional race was the Cadel Evans Great Ocean Road Race in Geelong, finishing 77th overall. A week later he had his best result for the 2016 season with a 15th place in stage 4 of the Herald Sun Tour.

His best result so far is a 10th place at the 2017 Tour de Taiwan. Kamstra competed at the 2017, 2018 and 2021 editions of Milan–San Remo.

Retirement

In 2021 he announced his retirement of Professional cycling. Despite having a contract for the 2022 season, he got diagnosed with a Myopathy. 
Kamstra is an ambassador for Castelli (brand), Julbo eyewear

References

External links

1993 births
Living people
Dutch male cyclists
People from Assen
Cyclists from Drenthe
People with type 1 diabetes